"A Thousand Deaths" is an 1899 short story by Jack London, his first work to be published. It is about the experimentally induced death and resuscitation/resurrection of the protagonist, by a mad scientist who uses multiple scientific methods for these experiments. It was published in Black Cat magazine. The story was adapted to film in 1939.

Film adaptation
In 1939, a Hollywood B movie titled Torture Ship was loosely based on "A Thousand Deaths".

In 2014, Writer/director Adam Zanzie released a short film adaptation which premiered at the St. Louis Filmmakers Showcase, where it won awards for Best Actor (John Bratkowski) and Best Sound Design. It later screened at the Trash Film Festival in Vȁraždīn, Croatia in 2016.

See also
Flatliners

References

External links 
 
 A Thousand Deaths at GASLIGHT

1899 short stories
Science fiction short stories
Short stories by Jack London
Short stories adapted into films